Fréro Delavega was a French musical duo made up of Jérémy Frérot and Florian "Flo" Delavega.

Frérot and Delavega took part in season 3 of the French musical competition series The Voice: la plus belle voix. After the competition, they formed a duo releasing a self-titled debut album Fréro Delavega premiering at number 1 in 2014. After break-up in 2017, both continue musical careers as solo artists.

The Voice: la plus belle voix
Fréro Delavega participated in the blind auditions with a rendition of "Caroline" from MC Solaar broadcast on 1 February 2014 on TF1 with only judge Mika turning his chair.  The remaining judges Florent Pagny, Jenifer and Garou refrained.

By default, Fréro Delavega were chosen to be part of Team Mika, progressing reaching the quarter-finals on 26 April 2014, before being eliminated.

Performances
Audition (1 February 2014): "Caroline" by MC Solaar (only one judge Mika turned chair, in Team Mika by default)
Musical Battle Round (15 March 2014): "Il y a" by Vanessa Paradis (Kept by coach, Quentin eliminated)
L'épreuve ultime Round (29 March 2014): "P.I.M.P." by 50 Cent (Saved by coach alongside Kendji Girac. Cloé eliminated)
Prime 2 Live (12 April 2014): "Sympathique (je ne veux pas travailler)" by Pink Martini (Élodie Martelet saved by public vote, with Fréro Delavega saved by coach and Marina D'Amico eliminated)
Prime 3 Live (19 April 2013): "Let Her Go" by Passenger (Saved by public vote alongside Kendji Girac, Élodie Martelet saved by coach, Caroline Savoie eliminated) 
Prime 4 – Quarter-finals (26 April 2014): "Je m'voyais déjà" by Charles Aznavour (Eliminated)

After The Voice
Fréro Delavega enjoyed popularity after participating in The Voice, with their official debut single "Sweet Darling" becoming a Top 20 hit in France. Their self-titled debut album Fréro Delavega premiered at number one on SNEP, the official French Albums Chart.

Members

Florian Delavega

Florian Garcia, known as Florian "Flo" Delavega, was born 12 June 1987, in Bordeaux, Gironde.

He graduated with a Science and Techniques of Physical and Sporting Activities (in French Sciences et techniques des activités physiques et sportives (STAPS)) and after obtaining the degree became a physical education teacher at Collège Toulouse-Lautrec in Langon and also at Collège Jean-Zay in Bondy. He quit his positions to concentrate on a musical career.

Since 2011, he has partnered with the Argentine musician and singer Natalia Doco. In January 2018, the couple had their first child, a boy.

Jérémy Frérot

Jérémy Frérot was born in Bruges, Gironde, southwestern France on 17 March 1990. He started playing guitar at age of 17. He studied for a degree in Science and Techniques of Physical and Sporting Activities (in French Sciences et techniques des activités physiques et sportives (STAPS)). He was an avid sportsman practicing surfing, rugby and judo and studied to become a teacher in physical education. But he didn't complete preferring in able to consecrate his time to music.

He was working as an education assistant at Collège la Grange aux Belles in Paris when he auditioned to The Voice: la plus belle voix, French version of The Voice.

In 2018, Frérot released his solo album Matriochka. Two singles were released from the album, "Revoir" and "Tu donnes". The album and both singles charted in France and Belgium. The album further reached number 12 in SNEP French Albums Chart and #29 in Belgium's francophone charts.

In 2020, Jérémy Frérot collaborated with the duo Madame Monsieur who featured him in their song "Comme un voleur".

In February 2021, he released his second album Meilleure vie.

He partnered with swimming athlete Laure Manaudou since 2015. The couple had a child in July 2017. Frérot had a boy, Lou, from a previous relation. Jérémy and Laure officially married on 12 May 2018.

Discography

Albums

Other releases
2014: Fréro Delavega (Deluxe Limited Edition)

EPs
2013: Onde sensuelle

Singles

Discography: Flo Delavega

Albums

Singles

*Did not appear in the official Belgian Ultratop 50 charts, but rather in the bubbling under Ultratip charts.

Discography: Jérémy Frérot

Albums

Singles

*Did not appear in the official Belgian Ultratop 50 charts, but rather in the bubbling under Ultratip charts.

Featured in

Other songs

References

External links
Official website 
Facebook

Musical groups established in 2011
French musical duos
The Voice (franchise) contestants
Capitol Records artists
Pop-folk music groups
2011 establishments in France